Syalguin is a village in the Bissiga Department of Boulgou Province in southeastern Burkina Faso in western Africa. As of 2005, the village has a population of 635.

References

Populated places in the Centre-Est Region
Boulgou Province